Bedford Brown (June 6, 1795 – December 6, 1870) was a Democratic United States Senator from the State of North Carolina between 1829 and 1840.

Biography
Bedford Brown was born on June 6, 1795 in what now is Locust Hill Township, Caswell County, North Carolina. His parents were Jethro Brown and Lucy Williamson Brown. After attending the University of North Carolina for one year, Brown was elected to the North Carolina House of Commons.

On July 13, 1816, Brown married Mary Lumpkin Glenn. The couple had seven children.

In 1828, upon the death of Bartlett Yancey, Jr., Brown was chosen in a special election to replace Yancey in the North Carolina Senate. Like Bartlett Yancey, Jr., before him, Brown was elected Speaker of the North Carolina Senate.

In 1829, he was elected as a Jacksonian (the party that would become the Democratic Party) to succeed John Branch as a United States Senator from North Carolina.  In the Senate, he chaired several committees, including the Agriculture Committee.  Brown resigned his seat in 1840 due to a dispute with the state legislature.  He was elected to the state Senate again in 1842, before spending some years out of the state.

Leading up to the Civil War, Brown, a state senator again from 1858 to 1860, counseled in favor of North Carolina's remaining in the Union. However, after President Lincoln requested troops from North Carolina to serve in the Union Army, Brown, along with most of his colleagues, supported secession.

In 1868 Brown, still a Democrat, was again elected to the North Carolina Senate. However, the Reconstruction Republicans controlled the North Carolina Legislature and refused to seat Brown. He was replaced by Republican John W. Stephens.

Brown was buried on the grounds at Rose Hill, just outside Yanceyville, North Carolina. Rose Hill was added to the National Register of Historic Places in 1973.

Footnotes

Further reading

 H.G. Jones, "Bedford Brown" in William S. Powell (ed.), Dictionary of North Carolina Biography. Chapel Hill, NC: University of North Carolina Press, 1979; pp. 240–241.
 Houston G. Jones, "Bedford Brown: States' Rights Unionist," North Carolina Historical Review, vol. 32 (1955).

External links

Bedford Brown profile - Caswell County Historical Association.

1795 births
1870 deaths
People from Caswell County, North Carolina
American people of Scotch-Irish descent
Jacksonian United States senators from North Carolina
Democratic Party United States senators from North Carolina
North Carolina Jacksonians
Democratic Party members of the North Carolina House of Representatives
Democratic Party North Carolina state senators
People of North Carolina in the American Civil War